Allan Holstensson  (1878–1961) was a Swedish politician. He was a member of the Centre Party.

References
 This article was initially translated from the Swedish Wikipedia article.

Centre Party (Sweden) politicians
1878 births
1961 deaths